Damania or Damaniya is a family name given to the original inhabitants of Daman, a specific Gujarati community within the Indian subcontinent.

Origin
The name "Damania" is derived from the small village called "Daman" (Union territory), which is in the Union Territory of Daman and Diu within India. The original people from Daman were given the last name "Damania".

Occurrence
The surname is largely seen in three communities: the Parsis; the Shia Muslims, including Ismaili Muslims and the Bohra and Bohri Muslims; and the Gujarati Hindus.

The Parsis came from Iran to India in the distant past and settled in Daman and nearby villages like Navasari and Vapi. The Shia Muslims were of two different subsects in the same community. One of these is the sect of Ismaili Muslims who also share this surname. These were converts from Hinduism: some living in the native villages, who were converted during the time of Aga Khan II when he was in process of shifting his residence to Bombay; and a few on request of the office of the Portuguese Governor General. A few companions of the Aga Khan settled at Daman and its surrounding areas for trade and some were appointed as zamindars. The other Shia Muslim group comprised the Shia Bohra and the Bohri community of merchants who settled at these places. The third, Hindu, community is descended from the original residents of Daman, who were famous for their shipbuilding skills. This carpenter community worships Vishvakarma, the god of architecture (called "Sthapatya kala" in Sanskrit).

A domestic airline and shipping company was started by Parvez Damania called "Damania Airways".

Notable persons
Zubin Damania (born 1973), American physician, comedian, internet personality, musician, and founder of Turntable Health.
Rustom Damania (born 1973),  Indian scientist credited with the development of NAL's Light Canard Research Aircraft, which later became DRDO Rustom.

See also
 Daman, Daman and Diu

Daman and Diu
Indian surnames